Grahabanga ( is a well-known novel by one of the most important novelists in Kannada S L Bhyrappa. The plot depicts rural India, starts around the 1920s and ends around the 1940s. The story has the heroic struggle of a woman against her idiotic husband, vicious mother-in-law, superstitious neighbors and pervading poverty. Tiptur, Channarayapatna regions are covered in this novel. This novel is considered an Indian classic and hence National Book Trust, India translated this into all the fourteen major languages of India. In 2003, it was made into a television series by Girish Kasaravalli which was produced by the actress Soundarya.

References

1970 novels
Kannada novels
1970 Indian novels
Indian novels adapted into television shows
Novels by S. L. Bhyrappa